Montepio, formerly Montepio Geral, is a Portuguese mutual savings organization, better known for its banking activity. Banco Montepio was established in 1844 and is headquartered in Lisbon.

The Montepio group is headed by the Montepio Geral - Associação Mutualista and includes the Banco Montepio (banking holding), the Lusitania (insurance company), the Lusitania Vida (life insurances), the Fundação Montepio (social solidarity foundation), the Futuro (pension fund management), the Montepio Gestão de Activos (investment fund management), the Residências Montepio (Senior residences management) and the Leacock (insurance broker company).

It served as the official jersey sponsor of the Portuguese national basketball team at the 2011 EuroBasket in Lithuania.

On February 20, 2019, Montepio released its new brand and became known as Banco Montepio.

History
Montepio was delisted from the Euronext stock exchange on the 15th of September 2017.

References

External links

Official Website

Banks of Portugal
Mutual organizations